Charlie Sexton, released in 1989, is the second studio album released by singer and guitarist Charlie Sexton.

Track listing
"Don't Look Back" (Charlie Sexton) – 4:42	
"Seems So Wrong" (Arthur Barrow, Tony Berg, Charlie Sexton) – 4:30
"Blowing up Detroit" (John Palumbo) – 4:59	
"I Can't Cry" (Marty Willson-Piper) – 4:28	
"While You Sleep" (Steve Earle, Charlie Sexton) – 4:45	
"For All We Know" (Arthur Barrow, Charlie Sexton, Danny Wilde) – 4:37	
"Battle Hymn of the Republic" (Tony Berg, Steve Kirkorian, Charlie Sexton) – 5:05	
"Question This" (Charlie Sexton, Scott Wilk) – 4:43	
"Save Yourself" (Arthur Barrow, Charlie Sexton) – 4:10	
"Cry Little Sister" (Michael Mainieri, Jr., Gerard McMann) – 4:48

Personnel
Charlie Sexton - Bass, Guitar, Piano, Keyboards, Programming, Vocals
Arthur Barrow - Bass, Keyboards, Programming
David Van Tieghem - Percussion

Charts

References

1989 albums
MCA Records albums
Charlie Sexton albums
Albums produced by Bob Clearmountain
Albums produced by Tony Berg